Night Shift, is a 2015 crime thriller television series produced by Hong Kong Television Network. The entire series was filmed at night.

Plot
The story links together the experiences of several EU assault team members working different night shifts. During their shifts, they already encounter all kinds of unfathomable dangers and challenges, but the true test of their endurance lies in the endless temptations that they face in the darkness of the night. With their willpower slowly weakening as the night wears on, their self-protection and restraint are also in danger of suffering serious blows.

Cast

Emergency Unit
 Frankie Lam as Heman
 Dominic Lam as Bao Kuk
 Kwok Fung as Tai Sir
 Luvin Ho as Kit
 Sin Ho-ying as Kai Yet 
 Wu Kwing-lung as Tsui Tsai
 Kong Fai as Wong Tze-hang

Night club
 Kathy Yuen as Aka
 Rachel Lam as Leslie
 Lena Wong as Rainbow
 Ruby Lau as Nana
 Jan Tse as Suki
 Jacky Yeung as Mark
 Benji Chiang as manager of the Bar
 Gregory Wong as guy in the Bar

Triads
 Bryant Mak as 6 Luck
 Philip Keung as Tai Dan
 Felix Lok as Che Ding
 Bond Chan as Tin Kau

Ambulance Unit
 Chow Tsz-lung as Yau Yung
 Wong Man-piu as Master Kai
 Jason Lam as Brother Kin

7-Eleven
 Crystal Leung as Ah Fa
 Oscar Chan as Jason
 Annie Chong as Sandy

Social worker
 Tong Chun-ming as Alan
 Bonnie Wong as Grandma 7
 Peter Lai as Tang Bak

Other cast
 Yetta Tse as Yan
 Alan Luk as Fat Kee
 Deon Cheung as Edwin
 Mizz Eva as Eva
 Ann Ho as Rene
 Anita Chan as Carman
 Cherry Pau as Ho Ying, (episode 7 & 11)

Production
Filming started on 8 September 2013 and ended on 26 November 2013.

Release
A behind the scenes video clip was posted on YouTube on 30 November 2013. The first trailer was released on HKTV's YouTube channel on 26 October 2014. A 9-minute preview was released on HKTV's YouTube channel on 11 August 2015.

References

External links
 Official website

Hong Kong Television Network original programming
2015 Hong Kong television series debuts
2010s Hong Kong television series